Left Together is a left-wing political party in Poland.

It was formed in 2015 as "Together", and it was one of the eight nationwide committees standing in the 2015 parliamentary election. It was a member of the Progressive International, and it has cooperated with DiEM25 since 2016. In 2022, Razem ended cooperation with both organizations, criticising their "lack of an unequivocal declaration of recognition of Ukraine's sovereignty and the absolute condemnation of Russian imperialism" during the 2022 Russian invasion of Ukraine. As of 2022, it is headed by a co-leadership consisting of Adrian Zandberg and Magdalena Biejat. It supports principles of democratic-socialism and has expressed progressive views. It also maintains a syndicalist faction.

History
Razem was founded as a response to the unsuccessful attempt to create a left-wing political platform in Poland during the 2015 presidential election. Another reason was dissatisfaction with the role of the post-communist Democratic Left Alliance as the main centre-left party. Many founders were previously activists in the Young Socialists, The Greens or local initiatives, including Kraków Against Games.

Razem's main political stances were formulated during the founding congress on 16–17 May 2015, when Razem's first National Board was elected, consisting of Jakub Baran, Aleksandra Cacha, Alicja Czubek, Maciej Konieczny, Magdalena Malińska, Mateusz Mirys, Katarzyna Paprota, Adrian Zandberg, and Marcelina Zawisza. However, several local structures were active even earlier, in March and April. The party was officially registered on 21 July 2015.

Razem registered lists for the 2015 parliamentary election in all electoral districts and received 3.6% of the vote in the election, below the 5% threshold to gain seats in parliament. However, having met the 3% threshold, the party received state subsidy for their election campaign.

In 2016 Razem instigated mass protests (called the Black Protest) against a bill that would impose a complete ban on abortion, proposed by a citizens' initiative. In 2016, Foreign Policy magazine included Agnieszka Dziemianowicz-Bąk of the Razem National Board, together with Barbara Nowacka of Polish Initiative (Inicjatywa Polska), in its annual list of the 100 most influential global thinkers for their role in organising the protest. In 2018, Forbes magazine included Marcelina Zawisza on its annual European Forbes 30 Under 30 list in the "Law & Policy" category for her role as a co-founder of Razem and one of the organizers of "black protest".

Since 2016, Razem has also been cooperating with the Democracy in Europe Movement 2025 (DiEM25) pan-European movement, founded by Yanis Varoufakis. In May 2017, Varoufakis has expressed DiEM25's support for Razem in the 2019 European Parliament election.

On 6 July 2017 Razem organised a protest against Donald Trump's visit to Poland. Protesters were dressed as handmaids from Margaret Atwood's The Handmaid's Tale, as a symbol of the stripping down of women's rights both in Poland and the United States.

In September 2017, Razem activists filed a complaint with the National Electoral Commission on behalf of the party, alleging that the Alliance of European Conservatives and Reformists had helped to fund a Law and Justice conference during the 2015 parliamentary election campaign in violation of European Parliament rules as well as Polish electoral law. On 29 October, the commission announced that it would investigate the complaint.

Razem was reluctant to launch a youth organisation, claiming that the party is already run by relatively young people and does not need a separate entity for teenage activists. Eventually, in May 2019, Razem formed Młodzi Razem (The Together Youth), which recruits supporters between 13 and 25 years of age. The organisation focuses on local activism and minority rights; several of its members are assistants to the party's politicians.

For the 2019 parliamentary election, Razem formed a coalition with the Democratic Left Alliance and Wiosna, known as The Left, winning 6 seats in the Sejm. Soon after the election results were announced, the National Board voted to oblige the six elected MPs to donate all income surpassing triple the minimum wage to charity; universally lowering politicians' pay to this threshold was one of the early postulates. Since the electoral list was formally registered to SLD, Razem's candidates could not receive funding from their own party. Instead, they made personal donations after having cashed out "appreciation bonus" from the party's budget. The situation caused uproar and was met with opposition within Razem.

Since January 2021, the party regularly releases a podcast "Partia Razem mówi ciekawe rzeczy" (The Together Party talks about interesting stuff). Episodes consist of interviews, discussions, solo talks, and speeches recorded during the parliamentary sessions. Outside of this, Razem livestreams on Facebook and YouTube.

Ideology

Economic, tax and labour policy 
The party advocates labour rights and opposes deregulation and privatisation of public services. Among its main goals are strengthening redistribution, adopting a 35-hour workweek, raising the income tax threshold to the equivalent of 12 times the minimum wage (ca. $3,200 as of 2016), establishing progressive corporate tax, and creating a healthcare programme funded directly from the state budget. It also wishes to completely remove special economic zones from Poland. The party's economic program is partially inspired by the Nordic model. The party considers itself part of the anti-austerity movement. British economist Guy Standing describes Razem as "the first authentic movement in Poland representing the precariat".

Social policy 

Razem is progressive on social issues, supporting drug liberalisation, sex education in schools and LGBT rights. It also strictly follows gender quotas and is for liberalising Poland's abortion law. The party is not known to be particularly antireligious, however it does hold secular agenda, including opposition to teaching Catholic religion in public schools, outlawing the conscientious objection right, limiting state funding of the Church and taxation thereof.

It has opposed the introduction of Single Member Electoral Constituencies for elections to the Polish Sejm, which in their opinion leads to the creation of a two-party system.

The party maintains a nuanced attitude towards the Polish People's Republic: while condemning its authoritarian practices, it is respectful of its legacy in terms of social progression and modernization. The party also opposes the so-called decommunization laws and the Institute of National Remembrance, which they deem are used by the ruling PiS party to wage a war against the historic memory and legacy of the political left.

Razem believes that Poland should "actively engage in the fight against climate change" and expresses its willingness to "take the necessary steps to adapt the economy [of Poland] to the challenges of climate change".

Foreign and defence policy 
Razem supports an active role for Poland in the international community, citing the United Nations and OSCE as the most important organizations in that context.

The party is a strong supporter of the European Union and has taken a stance against Brexit. The party believes that the EU, in its current form, represents the interests of 'big business', but has nonetheless found 'indisputable successes' and could be reformed to create a 'progressive' pan-European social and tax policy. The party is a proponent of stronger European integration. The party further proposes the creation of an EU army. On the other hand, it has criticised the Eurozone, stating that it had been 'poorly thought-out' and could lead to financial shocks in 'weaker Union economies', however adding that if the 'reformed' Eurozone were to become 'truly solidary', it would fully support Poland's adoption of the Euro.

The party has declared that it is convinced that NATO was 'not a sufficient tool' to ensure the lasting security of Poland and Europe, instead preferring the creation of an EU Army through the Common Security and Defence Policy.

It strongly supports efforts for international arms control and disarmament as part of a larger 'peace policy'.

The party states that it opposes 'all forms of imperialism' and has condemned the 2003 invasion of Iraq, which they deem to be a violation of international law.

It has also condemned Russian President Vladimir Putin's foreign policy, what they deem to be the Kremlin's 'nationalist hysteria', 'extreme conservatism' and 'legally sanctioned homophobia', as well as the Russian annexation of Crimea. It criticised the 2022 Russian invasion of Ukraine as "Putin that has repeatedly broken international law by infringing upon the territorial integrity of a neighbouring country" . At the same time, it has criticised 'the policy of the conservative-liberal Ukrainian government'. It has stated that, if in power, it would 'support social justice [in Ukraine] and limit the influence of the Ukrainian oligarchy'.

The party opposes TTIP and CETA, as they believe they will "lead to the undermining of financial stability and rapid growth of debt".

It poses a welcoming stance to refugees entering Poland and considers it an obligation of the Polish state to 'help the most deprived'. It also opposes the construction of border barriers.

The party has expressed sympathy and support for the Syrian and Turkish Kurds and has condemned Turkey's ruling AK Party, which they consider authoritarian and discriminatory.

Razem and other The Left politicians actively support the Belarusian protesters in Warsaw, following the hijacking of the Ryanair plane.

Structure

Left Together is headed by a co-leadership consisting of Adrian Zandberg and Magdalena Biejat. Until November 2022 the party had no singular leadership. Instead, it was governed by five branches:
Congress — the supreme authority of the party; elects the members of the National Executive Board, Council and Audit Commission, enacts the party program
National Council — the legislative body
National Executive Board — the executive body; members of the Board also act as public representatives of the party
National Audit Commission — the control body
National Court of Arbitration — the judicial body

This structure is mirrored on the local level, with the District Assemblies, Boards and Councils.

As of January 2021, the Board consists of five people: Anna Górska, Bartosz Grucela, Paulina Matysiak, Maciej Szlinder and Joanna Wicha.

Members elected to the IX term Sejm

Election Results

Sejm

European Parliament

Presidential

See also
:Category:Left Together politicians

References

 
Political parties in Poland